Brommella is a genus of  cribellate araneomorph spiders in the family Dictynidae, and was first described by Albert Tullgren in 1948.

Species
 it contains twenty-two species:
Brommella baiseensis Li, 2017 – China
Brommella bishopi (Chamberlin & Gertsch, 1958) – USA
Brommella casseabri Li, 2017 – China
Brommella chongzuoensis Li, 2017 – China
Brommella digitata Lu, Chen & Zhang, 2015 – China
Brommella dolabrata Li, 2017 – China
Brommella falcigera (Balogh, 1935) (type) – Europe, Turkey, Iran?
Brommella funaria Li, 2017 – China
Brommella hellenensis Wunderlich, 1995 – Greece
Brommella josephkohi Li, 2017 – China
Brommella lactea (Chamberlin & Gertsch, 1958) – USA
Brommella linyuchengi Li, 2017 – China
Brommella monticola (Gertsch & Mulaik, 1936) – USA
Brommella punctosparsa (Oi, 1957) – China, Korea, Japan
Brommella renguodongi Li, 2017 – China
Brommella resima Li, 2017 – China
Brommella sejuncta Li, 2017 – China
Brommella spirula Li, 2017 – China
Brommella tongyanfengi Li, 2017 – China
Brommella wangfengcheni Li, 2017 – China
Brommella xinganensis Li, 2017 – China
Brommella yizhouensis Li, 2017 – China

References

External links

Araneomorphae genera
Dictynidae
Spiders of Asia
Spiders of the United States